Crème de violette, also known as liqueur de violette, is a generic term for a liqueur with natural and/or artificial violet flower flavoring and coloring with either a brandy base, a neutral spirit base, or a combination of the two.  The taste profile and aroma are distinctly floral and sweet, and reminiscent of the violet candies popular in the early to mid 20th century.  Its known production dates back to the early 19th century when it was served with dry vermouth or alone as a cordial.

After crème de violette had been all but unavailable in the United States for decades, in mid-2007 Haus Alpenz began importing the Rothman & Winter Crème de Violette, which is made from Queen Charlotte and March violet flowers from the Alps. Since then, other brands of crème de violette have arrived on the US market, e.g., The Bitter Truth from Europe.

Crème de violette is the forerunner to the liqueurs Parfait d'Amour and the American variation, Creme Yvette, both of which are decidedly different with pronounced vanilla and/or citrus flavors.  When crème de violette is not available it is possible to use the Parfait Amour or creme Yvette to replicate the violet color in a drink, though the taste profile is quite different.

It is considered a core ingredient in the Aviation cocktail.

The rarity of crème de violette appeared as a plot element in an episode of The Avengers in 1965 entitled "Two's A Crowd".

Notes

References

External links
Haus Alpenz (Rothman & Winter Crème de Violette)

French liqueurs